is a puzzle mobile game featuring characters from Mappy which was released and published by Namco on April 23, 2003, only in Japan.

References

Japan-exclusive video games
Mobile games
2003 video games
Mappy
Video games about cats
Video games developed in Japan